"It's a Vibe" is a song by American rapper 2 Chainz, featuring American singers Ty Dolla Sign, Trey Songz, and Jhené Aiko. Produced by Murda Beatz and G Koop, it was released on March 14, 2017 as the second single from the former's fourth studio album Pretty Girls Like Trap Music.

Music video
A music video was released on April 20, 2017 on 2 Chainz's Vevo account on YouTube. The video features everyone in different sections of a private club relaxing.

Commercial performance
"It's a Vibe" debuted at number 95 on the US Billboard Hot 100 for the week of July 1, 2017. It has peaked at number 44, spending 20 weeks on the chart.

Charts

Weekly charts

Year-end charts

Certifications

Release history

References

External links

2016 songs
2017 singles
2 Chainz songs
Songs written by 2 Chainz
Ty Dolla Sign songs
Def Jam Recordings singles
Songs written by Trey Songz
Songs written by Jhené Aiko
Songs written by Murda Beatz
Songs written by Ty Dolla Sign